This is a list of specific seasons of bushfires in Australia including some significant bushfire events from each season. Across Australia, seasonality of bushfires varies significantly; however, is generally aligned with the weather patterns in the south of the continent so that each season begins in June (the beginning of the Australian winter) and runs through the following May (the end of the Australian autumn). The worst season recorded is 1974-75, with  burned, equivalent to 15 percent of Australia's physical land mass  that equates to the entire area of France, Spain, and Portugal combined.

1800s 
 1897-98 Australian bushfire season: 
 1850-51 Australian bushfire season: 
Black Thursday bushfires: 12 fatalities, one million sheep and thousands of cattle were killed, and the fire burnt the second largest area (approximately ) in history (CFA 2003a; DSE 2003b).

1920s 
1925-26 Australian bushfire season

1930s 
1938-1939 Black Friday bushfires

1940s 
1943-44 Australian bushfire season

1960s 

 1965 New South Wales bushfires. The Chatsbury-Bungonia bushfires destroyed much of the villages of Towrang, Tallong, Wingello, and Penrose, orchards, and livestock, affecting 250,000 hectares (620,000 acres). It broke out in the Southern Highlands and spread toward Nowra. Three people died.
1966-67 Australian bushfire season: 62 fatalities, 900 injured, 7,000 left homeless, 4,286 buildings lost
The 1967 Tasmanian fires: 110 separate fire fronts burnt through  of land in southern Tasmania. The destruction included 1,293 homes, around 62,000 farm animals, over 1,700 other buildings, 80 bridges, 4,800 sections of power lines, 1,500 motor vehicles and over 100 other structures.
1961 Western Australian bushfires The towns of Dwellingup and Karridale were basically destroyed, along with many small settlements that were not rebuilt. The Dwellingup fire migrated to the town of Pinjarra where it burned a significant number of buildings.

1970s 
1974-75 Australian bushfire season: approximately  burned. The area burnt, is equivalent to 15 percent of Australia's physical land mass  that equates to the entire area of France, Spain, and Portugal combined.

1980s 
 1984-85 Australian bushfire season: NSW in 1984-85,  were burnt, four lives were lost, 40,000 livestock were killed and $40m damage to property was caused (RFS 2003a).
 1982-1983 Australian bushfire season: The Ash Wednesday fires of 16 February 1983 caused severe damage in Victoria and South Australia. In Victoria,  were burnt, 2,080 houses destroyed, more than 27,000 stock lost and 47 people lost their lives (CFA 2003a; DSE 2003b, 2003d). Property-related damage was estimated at over $200m and more than 16,000 fire fighters, 1,000 police and 500 defence personnel fought the fires in Victoria. In South Australia,  were burnt, 383 houses were destroyed, 28 people were killed and property-related damage was estimated to be more than $200m (DSE 2003d).

1990s 
1998–99 Australian bushfire season: 5 fatalities
Linton bushfire: 5 firefighters killed on 2 December near  in Victoria
1997–98 Australian bushfire season: 4 fatalities and10 houses lost
1996–97 Australian bushfire season: 3 fatalities and 44 houses lost 
1 house destroyed in October near  in Queensland.
3 fatalities and 43 houses lost on 19 January in the Dandenong Ranges and Mornington Peninsula.
1994–95 Australian bushfire season: 23 houses lost
23 houses lost from September to November in southeast Queensland.
1993–94 Australian bushfire season:  4 fatalities, 206 houses lost,  burnt in NSW
1994 Eastern seaboard fires: 4 fatalities and 206 houses lost on the east coast of New South Wales
1992–93 Australian bushfire season: 4 houses lost
1991–92 Australian bushfire season: 3 fatalities, 17 houses lost
2 fatalities and 14 houses lost on 16 October in western Sydney and the Central Coast in New South Wales
1990-91 Australian bushfire season: 4 fatalities, 25 houses lost
3 fatalities in Queensland
8 houses lost on 23 December across New South Wales
1 fatality and 17 houses lost on 27 December at

2000s 
2009–10 Australian bushfire season: 2 fatalities, at least 57 houses lost
5 houses lost during November near Swansea and St Helens in Tasmania
A park ranger died in a helicopter crash on 9 December in the Dorrigo National Park in New South Wales
9 houses lost on 17 December at Gerogery, Tooma and Michelago in New South Wales
6 houses lost on 23 December at Port Lincoln in South Australia
37 houses lost on 29 December near Toodyay in Western Australia
A firefighter killed in a vehicle accident on 10 January near Tatong on the way to a fire near Mansfield in Victoria.
2008–09 Australian bushfire season: 173 fatalities, 2,060 houses lost 
2 houses lost on 13 January at Port Lincoln in South Australia
31 houses lost from 30 January to 1 February at Yinnar, Boolarra and Mirboo North in Victoria
Black Saturday bushfires: 173 fatalities, 2,056 houses lost and  burned on 7 February at numerous locations in Victoria
2007–08 Australian bushfire season: 5 fatalities, 1 house lost 
3 truck drivers killed on 30 December at Boorabbin National Park in Western Australia
One house lost on 10 January in the Kangarilla and Echunga area of South Australia
2006–07 Australian bushfire season: 5 fatalities, 63 houses lost
7 houses lost on 24 September at Picton, Thirlmere and Oakdale in New South Wales
 1 fatality, 33 houses lost, and  burnt in the Great Divide fire complex from 1 December 2006 to 7 February 2007 across alpine Victoria
22 houses lost on 11–14 December at Scamander and Four Mile Creek in Tasmania
1 house lost on 12 December at Kalamunda in Western Australia
2005–06 Australian bushfire season: 3+ fatalities, 54 houses lost 
Jail Break Inn Fire: 10 houses lost on 1 January near Junee in New South Wales
3 houses lost on 1 January near Gosford in New South Wales
Mount Lubra bushfire: 2 fatalities, 41 houses lost and  burned from 19 January around the Grampians National Park in Victoria
2 fatalities and 16 houses lost from other fires during January in Victoria
2004–05 Australian bushfire season: 9 fatalities, 3 houses lost 
Eyre Peninsula bushfire: 9 fatalities and 93 houses lost on 11 January on the Eyre Peninsula in South Australia
2002–03 Australian bushfire season: 7 fatalities and at least 549 houses lost 
1 fatality and 10 houses lost from 16–29 October near Toowoomba in Queensland
10 houses lost on 9 October at Engadine in New South Wales
2002 Sydney: 41 homes were lost on 4 December 2002 at Glenorie, a suburb north of Sydney.
2003 Eastern Victorian alpine bushfires: 41 houses lost and  burned from 8 January to 19 March in northeastern Victoria.
2003 Canberra bushfires: 4 fatalities and 488 houses lost on 18 January in western Canberra and nearby townships.
2001–02 Australian bushfire season: 110 houses lost
Black Christmas bushfires: 109 houses lost and  burned from 24 December to 16 January at numerous locations in New South Wales.
1 house lost in March at Glenaroua in Victoria
2000–01 Australian bushfire season: 11 houses lost
11 houses lost from 1–9 February at Tulka in South Australia.

2010s 
2018–19 Australian bushfire season: 35 houses lost, 1 fatality
2017–18 Australian bushfire season: 94 buildings lost
2016–17 Australian bushfire season: 46 houses lost
2015–16 Australian bushfire season: 9 fatalities, 408 houses lost
The most destructive bushfire season in terms of human life and property loss since the 2008–09 Australian bushfire season prior to the 2019-2020 bushfires. Insurance losses of around 
At least  burned 
Loss of 408 houses and at least 500 non-residential buildings 
8 deaths as a direct result of fire: 6 people died in Western Australia, 2 in South Australia. In New South Wales a volunteer firefighter died due to unrelated health complications while on duty.
2015 Esperance bushfires: 4 fatalities; 19 buildings destroyed
2015 Pinery bushfire: 2 fatalities; 470+ buildings destroyed
2016 Tasmanian bushfires: catastrophic impact on Tasmanian Wilderness World Heritage Area lands
2014–15 Australian bushfire season: 1 fatality, 48 houses lost
 burned over twelve days in September and threatened the town of Tom Price and the western portion of Karijini National Park in Western Australia
2015 Sampson Flat bushfires, South Australia: 32 houses lost, 125 outbuildings
2013–14 Australian bushfire season: 3 fatalities, 335 buildings lost 

2013 New South Wales bushfires: 2 fatalities, 208 houses lost  bushland burnt including parts of the World Heritagelisted Greater Blue Mountains
32 houses lost on 15–20 January around the northern Grampians in western Victoria
15 houses lost on 17–19 January in the Barossa Valley and Flinders Ranges in South Australia.
The Snowy River bushfire in Eastern Victoria in February 2014. Also burning were fires at Hazelwood coal mine and Kilmore
2012–13 Australian bushfire season: 4 fatalities, 314 buildings lost 
7 houses lost on 11 November at Tulka near Port Lincoln, South Australia
Several properties lost from 8–10 December at Myora Springs, Stradbroke Island, Queensland
2013 Tasmanian bushfires:  1 fatality and 203 houses lost from 3–5 January in Dunally, Boomer Bay, Bicheno, Sommers Bay, and Copping
9 houses lost on 8 January at Snake Valley, Chepstowe and Carngham in Victoria
51 houses lost from 13–17 January from a fire in the Warrumbungle National Park west of Coonabarabran, New South Wales
 1 fatality and 22 houses lost from 17–18 January in bushfires affecting Coongulla, Glenmaggie, Heyfield, Newry and Seaton in Victoria
2 firefighters killed by a falling tree on 13 February fighting a fire near Harrietville
1 fatality and 4 houses lost during February in fires affecting Esperance, Boddington and Bridgetown in Western Australia
16 houses lost on 27 March at Dereel in Victoria
1 house lost on 9 May near Cherryville in South Australia
2011–12 Australian bushfire season: 32 houses lost
32 houses lost on 23–26 November near Margaret River in Western Australia
2010–11 Australian bushfire season: 83 houses lost
10 houses lost on 10–12 January at Lake Clifton in Western Australia
2 houses lost on 1–3 February in Gippsland, Victoria
71 houses lost on 5–7 February near Roleystone and Kelmscott in Western Australia

2020s 

2019–20 Australian bushfire season
 At least 2,680 homes lost
 33 deaths (including four firefighters and three US firefighters operating a Lockheed Martin C-130 Large Air Tanker that crashed in the Snowy Monaro Region of southern NSW)
 At least 1.25 billion wild animals killed
 At least  burned
 2020–21 Australian bushfire season

See also 

 Bushfires in Australia
 List of major bushfires in Australia
 List of natural disasters in Australia

Notes

References

External links 
Australian Emergency Management Knowledge Hub
NSW Rural Fire Service: Brief History of Bush Fires in NSW
Victorian Country Fire Authority: Major Fires
South Australia Country Fire Service: Bushfire History

List
 
bushfire seasons